Southeast Holgate Boulevard is a light rail station on the MAX Green Line in Portland, Oregon. It is the 4th stop southbound on the I-205 MAX branch. The station is at the intersection of Interstate 205 and Holgate Boulevard. This station has a center platform, and has a park-and-ride facility on the west side.

Also Lents Park is by the station on 92nd and SE Holgate Blvd.

Bus line connections
This station in Lents is served by the following bus lines:

17 - Holgate/Broadway

References

External links
Station information (with northbound ID number) from TriMet
Station information (with southbound ID number) from TriMet
MAX Light Rail Stations – more general TriMet page

MAX Light Rail stations
MAX Green Line
Railway stations in the United States opened in 2009
2009 establishments in Oregon
Railway stations in Portland, Oregon